Harpreet Gill (born 28 October 1958) is an Indian field hockey player. She competed in the women's tournament at the 1980 Summer Olympics.

References

External links
 

1958 births
Living people
Indian female field hockey players
Olympic field hockey players of India
Field hockey players at the 1980 Summer Olympics
Place of birth missing (living people)